China participated in the 2014 Asian Games in Incheon, South Korea from 19 September to 4 October 2014.

Medal summary

Medal table

Medalists

Archery

Men's recurve

Women's recurve

Athletics

Men's

Women

Badminton

Men

Men's team

Women

Women's team

Mixed Doubles

Baseball 

Men

Basketball

Men

Women

Boxing

Men

Women

Canoeing

Slalom
Men

Women

Sprint
Men

Women

Cricket

Men

Women

Cycling

Road

Track
Sprints

Pursuits

Keirin

Omnium

Mountain Bike

BMX

Diving

Men

Women

Equestrian

Dressage

Eventing

Field hockey

Men

Women

Football

Men

Women

Golf

Men

Women

Gymnastics

Artistic gymnastics
Men
Individual Qualification & Team all-around Final

Individual

Women
Individual Qualification & Team all-around Final

Individual

Rhythmic gymnastics

Individual Qualification & Team all-around Final

Individual all-around

Trampoline

Handball

Men

Women

Judo

Men

Women

Karate

Men's kumite

Women's kumite

Modern pentathlon

Men

Women

Rowing

Men

Open

Rugby sevens

Men

Women

Sailing

Men

Women

Open

Shooting

Men
Rifle

Shotgun

Softball

Women

Squash

Men

Men's team

Women

Women's team

Swimming

Men

Women

Synchronized swimming

Synchronized swimming

Table tennis
Men's

Men's team

Women's

Women's team

Mixed

Taekwondo

Men

Women

Tennis

Men

Women

Mixed Doubles

Triathlon

Men

Women

Mixed team relay

Volleyball

Indoor

Men

Women

Water polo

Men

Women

Weightlifting

Men

Women

Wrestling

Men's freestyle

Men's Greco-Roman

Women's freestyle

Wushu

Men's sanda

Men's taolu

Women's sanda

Women's taolu

References

Nations at the 2014 Asian Games
2014
Asian Games